Sainte-Marie and St. Mary were federal electoral districts in Quebec, Canada, that were represented in the House of Commons of Canada from 1896 to 1979.

This riding was created in 1892 as "St. Mary" riding from parts of Montreal East riding. It consisted of St. Mary's ward in the city of Montreal. In 1914, it was expanded to include papineau ward. After 1924, it was defined as being a part of the city of Montreal circumscribed by a number of streets.

In 1952, St. Mary riding was abolished, and replaced by "Sainte-Marie" riding. In 1976, this riding was abolished when it was redistributed into Hochelaga, Laurier and Saint-Henri ridings.

From 1978 to 1980, Hochelaga riding was known as "Sainte-Marie", and from 1981 to 1987, it was known as "Montreal—Sainte-Marie". See that article for more information.

Members of Parliament

This riding elected the following Members of Parliament:

Election results

St. Mary, 1896–1953

|Canadian Party
|Joseph Raoul Périllard
|align=right|4,802

Sainte-Marie, 1953–1979

See also 

 List of Canadian federal electoral districts
 Past Canadian electoral districts

External links

Riding history from the Library of Parliament:
St. Mary (1892 - 1947)
St. Mary (1947 - 1952)
Sainte-Marie (1952 - 1976)
Montreal--Sainte-Marie (1981 - 1987)

Former federal electoral districts of Quebec